Way to Go (French: Jusqu'ici) is a 2015 Canada/France interactive film and virtual reality web-based experience created by the Montreal digital studio AATOAA (Philippe Lambert, Édouard Lanctôt-Benoit and Caroline Robert) and produced by National Film Board of Canada (Hugues Sweeney) and France Télévisions. The production lets users take a virtual walk in the woods, through a combination of animation and immersive video.

User experience
In February 2016, Animation World Network'''s Jennifer Wolfe described the user experience as follows:

ReceptionWay to Go'' was unveiled as VR installation at the 2015 Sundance Film Festival’s New Frontier showcase. Awards to date include three 2016 Webby Awards, Webby and People's Voice awards in the Web/NetArt category as well as the Webby Award for Online Film & Video/VR: Gaming, Interactive or Real-Time. On 27 April 2015, it was named Cutting Edge Project of the Week at the Favourite Website Awards.

References

External links

Interactive films
France Télévisions
National Film Board of Canada documentaries
Virtual reality films
Webby Award winners
Quebec films
Films set in forests
2015 films
Canadian animated documentary films
2010s Canadian films